– formerly known as  and  – is a Buddhist temple in Okamoto, Ikaruga, Nara Prefecture, Japan.
The temple was constructed to honor Avalokitesvara, and an 11-faced statue of the goddess is the primary object of worship in the temple.  Hokki-ji is often considered to be one of the seven great temples founded by Prince Shōtoku, but in fact the temple was not completed until some decades after his death.  In 1993, it was registered together with Hōryū-ji as an UNESCO World Heritage Site under the name Buddhist Monuments in the Hōryū-ji Area.

History
Hokki-ji is located in Ikaruga, a town that has long been a focal point of Japanese Buddhism, and the area contains numerous other old temples related to Prince Shotoku, such as Hōrin-ji and Chūgū-ji.  Hokki-ji is located on a foothill to the northeast of Hōryū-ji Tō-in. It is said that the temple lies atop the ruins of  palace, wherein Prince Shōtoku had lectured on the Lotus Sutra, and that according to the prince's last will and testament, his son, Prince Yamashiro (Yamashiro no Ōe no ō) rebuilt the former palace as a temple.  Excavation conducted around the temple grounds has revealed the remains of a building, the pillars of which were in direct contact with the earth (i.e. there was no foundation stone), confirming that another building had occupied the grounds prior to Hokki-ji.

The temple is laid out such that the main hall and the pagoda are aligned along the east-west axis, similar to the layout of Hōryū-ji Sai-in.  However, Hokki-ji's main hall is in the west, and the tower is in the east; the opposite of Hōryū-ji Sai-in. This kind of temple layout has come to be known as "Hokki-ji style".

Cultural value

The only original 8th-century building remaining is the 24m-high three-storied pagoda, which is the oldest of its kind in Japan, and a National Treasure.  The lecture hall is a 1694 reconstruction, and Shōten-do hall is an 1863 reconstruction.

The shrine contains a wooden 3.5m-tall 11-faced statue of Avalokitesvara that was constructed in the latter half of the 10th century.  A copper image of a bodhisattva constructed in the latter half of the seventh century is currently entrusted to the Nara National Museum.  Both of these items have been designated Important Cultural Properties.

See also 
List of National Treasures of Japan (temples)
 For an explanation of terms concerning Japanese Buddhism, Japanese Buddhist art, and Japanese Buddhist temple architecture, see the Glossary of Japanese Buddhism.

References

Much of the content of this article comes from the equivalent Japanese-language article, accessed on July 29, 2006.

External links

Hokiji homepage
Nara Prefectural Tourist Guide for Ikaruga

Buddhist temples in Nara Prefecture
World Heritage Sites in Japan
National Treasures of Japan
Important Cultural Properties of Japan
Pagodas in Japan
Historic Sites of Japan
Prince Shōtoku
Religious buildings and structures completed in 638
7th-century Buddhist temples